The Toronto Eagles Australian Football Club (commonly known as the Toronto Eagles) is an amateur Australian rules football club competing in the AFL Ontario Australian football league.

The club was formed in 1989 when the then Canadian Australia Football Association (now known as AFL Ontario) began. They are based at Humber College (North Campus) in Etobicoke, Toronto, Ontario, Canada which has been their home for 10 years. Since entering the competition, the Eagles have become the most successful club in AFL Ontario history, winning 13 premierships, being runners up in 2018, and competing in finals constantly over the years.

History
In 1989, members of the local Australian community in Toronto, Canada congregated to play a number of Australian Rules football matches. Sighting some growing enthusiasm, AFL Ontario, which was then known as the Canadian Australian Football League and more recently as the Ontario Australian Football League (OAFL), was established later that year.

Soon after forming the AFLO, the pioneers of the league formed an affiliation with teams from the Australian Football League (AFL). This affiliation brought forward the formation of two teams – the Toronto Panthers and the Mississauga Mustangs.

1989 was a trying year for the Toronto Panthers as they lost every game that season until the inaugural Grand Final which saw the Toronto Panthers begin a legacy of winning football. The Panthers would defeat the Mississauga Mustangs 65 to 48 in the grand final, winning the inaugural Conacher Cup. The Panthers would then go on to win the next two Premierships, capturing three in a row amidst increasingly difficult competition.

At the end of 1991, amongst pressures of league expansion, many core Panthers left the club to form other teams. During these years, the team was pressured to recruit Canadian born players and introduce them to the game. In the next three years Toronto would fare well with one undefeated season, losing only by disqualification in the play-offs and another, which saw the Panthers once again make it all the way to the Grand Final.

By 1994, the Panthers were attracting many traveling or newly resided Australian players of top quality. That, combined with an exceptional base of talented Canadians players completed the rebuilding of their Championship squad.

1995 was a turning point for the Toronto Panthers football club as their new membership brought with it a new affiliation. The West Coast Eagles football club of the Australian Football League (AFL) would become the new sister club to the Toronto Panthers. That year the Toronto Panthers were reborn as the Toronto Eagles, trading their white with blue stripes for the blue and gold colors of the West Coast Eagles. To assist the Club with the transformation the West Coast Eagles helped by providing team uniforms and footballs, a gesture that was greatly appreciated by the club.

Regenerated as the Toronto Eagles, they then went to be undefeated the entire 1995 season, winning their fourth premiership in six years. Toronto’s high flying Eagles would then go on to capture the next four premierships in a row, establishing themselves as the dominant team in the AFLO. The Eagles would then fare well in the following two seasons but wouldn’t get their hand on the cup until 2002 when they would win their 9th premiership.

2006 and 2007 once again saw the Toronto Eagles tasting premiership glory as they would win back to back flags in impressive style. 2009 would see the Eagles win again, before a rebuilding phase. In 2017 the Eagles secured their 13th AFLO title in 26 seasons, firmly establishing the Toronto Eagles as the only true dynasty in AFL Ontario history.

Club Symbols

The Toronto Eagles official colours are royal blue, gold, and white. The club's current logo features a stylised Wedge-tailed Eagle with the words "Toronto Eagles" written underneath. Previous logos have all incorporated a stylised eagle's head. The club's current guernsey design features a stylised eagle's head taken from the club's logo on navy blue.

The club's official team song is "We're the Eagles", composed by Kevin Peek, a former member of the band Sky, and initially recorded at Peek's studio in Roleystone.

Club Awards

AFL Ontario Premierships
1989   1990   1991   1995   1996   1997   1998   1999   2002   2006   2007   2009  2017

Club Honour Board

Women's Awards

Individual awards

AFL ONTARIO BEST AND FAIREST
The Best and Fairest award is awarded to the best player in the competition during the home-and-away season as voted by the umpires:

Winners
2018 - Dean Gavin
2017 - Dean Gavin
2015 - Mikael Avramov
2009 - Ajit Alister
1997 - Arnie Korpela
1995 - Rod Cutler
1992 - Mark Block
1990 - Mark Block and David Kerr
1989 - Tim Maud

Runner up
2007 - Lockie McDonald

AFL ONTARIO ROOKIE OF THE YEAR
2018 - Sean Fahey
1997 - Luke Davies
1994 - Arnie Korpela
1990 - David Kerr
1989 - Patrick Grant

 	 	 
AFL ONTARIO LEADING GOAL KICKER
2019 - Aaron Falcioni (43) 	
2008 - Troy Marsh (59)
1999 - Troy Marsh (44)
1994-97 - Mick Pearson
1990-93 - Peter Vitols
1989 - Glen Walker (9)

See also

External links

References

Australian rules football clubs in Toronto
Etobicoke
Ontario Australian Football League clubs
1989 establishments in Ontario
Australian rules football clubs established in 1989